Pale is a municipality of the city of Istočno Sarajevo located in Republika Srpska, an entity of Bosnia and Herzegovina. It is situated southeast of the capital city of Sarajevo. As of 2013, it had a population of 22,282 inhabitants, while the town of Pale has a population of 13,883 inhabitants.

History

Middle Ages

Pale always represented an important junction between east and west that is the Sarajevo Valley and the Drina River basin. There are preserved ruins of roads and building from the Roman times in the nearby villages of Miosici and Ilijak. From early on this area served as a place of trade. In the late 14th and early 15th century the area surrounding Pale belonged to the Feudal House of Pavlović. There were several fortified settlements: Pavlovac on the River Prača, Gradina in the Upper Pale and Hodidjed above the junction of the Miljacka rivers. The Hodidjed settlement served as an administrative center for the surrounding area.

The feudal house of Pavlović belonged to the upper crust of the Bosnian aristocracy, their holdings extended from Vrhbosna (today's Sarajevo) on the West to Dobruna on the east. Pavle Radenović, the founder of the Pavlović line, aside from his ancestral holdings around Pale also owned the mines in Olovo, the city of Trebinje, and parts of Konavle and Cavtat. The area under his control enjoyed prosperous trade between the locals and the Merchants from Dubrovnik. The main trading center was the town of Praca, part of the Pale Municipality today. After the death of Pavle in 1415 during a duel, his younger son Radoslav Pavlović (1420–1421) would take over from his father.

After the death of the Bosnian King Tvrtko I in 1391 the Bosnian feudals houses struggled to gain the throne. The sons of Pavle, under the threat from other Bosnian aristocrats, asked for the help of their allies the Ottomans. The Ottomans pursued a strategy of divide and conquer that eventually resulted in complete conquest.

Ottoman rule

After the fall of Bosnia the feudal holdings of the House of Pavlović were divided into 11 districts, and renamed the entire area the "Pavli Vilayet. The first Ottoman census in the year 1468–69 the town of Pale is recorded under the name of "Bogazi Yumry" as the seat of one of the 11 districts. The district of "Bogazi Yumry" contained six villages of which two were located on the plane of Pale.

Due to the harsh conditions in which the local Christian population found itself, there is very little data about the urban development during the Ottoman rule of this area in the Middle Ages. The area continued to be commercially viable and valuable to the new rulers. The town of Praca continued to grow and expand until the great fire and outbreak of Black Death in the 18th century. The name "Pavli Vilayet" continued to be used for this area until the beginning of the 19th century and the town eventually came to be known as Pale. One of the earliest recordings of this new name is a map from 1877, where the town itself as well as the entire region are labelled as "Pale".

During the 19th century the Ottoman Empire found itself under the two politically and socially completely different power struggles. The early decades of the 19th century were marked with a series of national and ethnic freedom movements of the many subject people. The Ottoman aristocracy on the other hand was deeply conservative and was resisting any efforts towards reform and development of a centralized state. The aristocracy in Bosnia was among the most dissatisfied in the empire, jealously guarding its right against the powers.

In 1831, Captain Husein Gradaščević, one of the wealthiest and most powerful members of the Bosnian aristocracy, came to lead the rebel aristocrats. After the conquest of Travnik, the seat of the Ottoman Viceroy, the Bosnian aristocracy demanded that the Sultan halt his reform efforts and keep the status quo in Bosnia. In addition they wanted the right to vote for and appoint the Viceroy from among their ranks.

Captain Hussain did not wait for the Sultan to answer their demands and appointed himself the Vice Roy of Bosnia, alienating many of his supporters in the process. The Sultan played the different factions against each other and in 1832 sent an army against the rebels. One of the decisive battles against the rebels took place in the town of Pale itself. Captain Husein did not command sufficient numbers of troops and suffered a defeat. The decisive victory broke the back of the revolt.

Austro-Hungarian rule

With the Berlin Congress Bosnia was placed under the administration of Austria-Hungary. During this time significant investment and economic changes were made in Pale and the surrounding areas.

The new overlords were favoring the exploitation of the natural resources, primarily mineral and wood products.  The town of Pale at this point becomes an important logging and wood products center in the region. According to the 1895 census, Pale with the adjacent villages had 483 inhabitants. 440 inhabitants were engaged in agricultural and logging activities while 27 were engaged in clerical work. Industrial development spurs on supporting activities. New trade shops, hotels and other service activities are brought to the town.

In February 1907 Pale receives the first Elementary School. The school was administered by the school-church board of the Serbian Orthodox Church in Pale. The school admitted students regardless of their faith. Along with Orthodox Christians, Catholic and Jewish students also attended the school. These were mostly the children of people who were involved in the town log mill.

According to administrative records of the Austro-Hungarian administration, by 1879 in Pale there were already two modern log mills, and their products were transported to Sarajevo.  With the construction of the rail line connecting the Bosnian capital of Sarajevo with its eastern border town Višegrad the town of Pale received its first railway station. The railway link enabled Pale to continue to grow and prosper with foreign investment making it possible to open several additional mills in the town. Construction of the Bosnian Eastern Railway from Sarajevo to Uvac and Vardište started in 1903. It was completed in 1906, using the  track gauge. With the cost of 75 million gold crowns, which approximately translates to 450 thousand gold crowns per kilometer, it was one of the most expensive railways in the world built by that time. The line was closed down in 1978, and dismantled afterwards.

World War I

In the early months of 1914 after the decisive Serbian victory at the Battle of Cer the allies requested from the Serbs and their Montenegrin allies to attack the Austro-Hungarians in Bosnia and tie up their forces there.

In October 1914 the Serbo-Montenegrin armies penetrated the areas surrounding Sarajevo and gained control of Mt. Romanija. During that operation, Montenegrin units entered Pale. Soon afterwards, the Montenegrins had to withdraw. Along with them a large part of the local Serbian population.

Those who were unable to flee were at the mercy of the Austrian Schutz corps, irregular Austrian police forces tasked with suppressing revolt within the empire. Pale was pillaged and burned down completely after the Austrian forces re-entered the town. 54 local residents were lynched in the town center.

In the town of Goražde, a refugee column of villagers from nearby villages such as Praca, Vijara, Budj, Podgrab, Vrhpraca, Gorovici, Hotocine, Glasinac, Podromanija and Socica were intercepted by Austrian regular forces and the irregulars before they could cross the Drina river. 48 adult men were separated from the rest of the group and executed by pistol-shot, while the remaining refugees were forced into detention camps.

Conditions in these detention camps were especially harsh. Among the most infamous was the detention camp in Doboj. From December 1914 to July 1917 more than 45,000 people (mostly Serbs) were detained there. While the exact numbers of fatalities will probably never be known, more than 1000 fatalities were identified, 230 of which were from the Pale municipality.

Post-World War I

With the end of the war and the absorption of Bosnia into the newly created Kingdom of Yugoslavia, the town of Pale once again struck out towards growth. The basis for economic recovery and development once again, as before, were based the on the natural resources of the region, in particular forestry.

Newly developed transportation links with Sarajevo spurred growth. In 1928 the town itself became the center of the municipality. Increased economic development spurred population growth. Between 1921 and 1931 the number of inhabitants increased from 2,382 to 11,103.

In the 1930 one could already find 30 to 40 large buildings. In 1935 a modern water supply system was put into use. The town flourished culturally as well. New and old schools were renovated and built. A community center, completed in 1928, dedicated to the victims of World War I featured gymnastic equipment and from time to time cultural and entertainment events were held there. Amateur theater and folk dance companies were active there as well.

In 1934 the Vihor Football Club was founded, and along with it a new soccer stadium was constructed. The cultural and sport society "Soko" was responsible for a large level of participation by Pale's inhabitants in their athletic programs. The members of this club would go on to successfully compete in Zagreb, Ljubljana and Prague. In this period the town also received the first medical facility as well as a library.

By the 1940 Pale already have the looks of a small, but very well arranged city. A significant number of intellectuals as well as affluent and influential people from Sarajevo and other places in the country constructed summer homes in Pale.  All of this was interrupted with the German attack on Yugoslavia in April 1941. After the conquests of Zagreb and Belgrade the German forces turned their drive towards the center of the country. On 15 April, a German motorized division would occupy Sarajevo and capture the Yugoslav Supreme Military command in the town of Pale itself. By April 1941 a complete surrender was signed. The short April war brought on a full dismemberment of the country. The town of Pale was incorporated into the Nazi-affiliated Independent State of Croatia.

The first of act of the newly installed puppet regime in the town of Pale was the demolition of the World War I Victim Memorial as well the demolition of the Eastern Orthodox Church. All Serb enterprises were nationalized and taken over by Nazi sympathizers. The former home to the cultural center was turned into the HQ of the local regiment of Ustashe, which would soon serve as prison and detention center. Mass deportations, executions of prominent Serbs were daily occurrences. During the summer of 1941 the first massacres occurred, the villages of Njemanici and Bjelogorica were completely destroyed and more than sixty people were murdered.

Faced with this kind of mistreatment the local populace started an armed revolt. The initial skirmishes took place in the early morning hours of 1 August 1941. The occupation forces tried to brutally suppress this revolt and during the month of August more than 75 prominent town folk were arrested and deported to death camps.

In mid-November 1943 in a retaliatory expedition the Ustashe killed more than 100 inhabitants of the village of Rakovac. After 45 men out of that village reported to the Ustaše administration for the issuance of new identification documents they were all arrested and in pairs of two were chained to each other. They were transported and murdered. After they killed the men they went to Rakovac to kill the remaining women, children and the elderly. Once the surviving witnesses, Milan Starčević, residing today in Pale, testified: "After they say that a part of the village inhabitants was missing the Ustashe sent out search parties and came to the Alija Hill. There they were stopped by the Germans. The Germans did not allow them to go into the Santrac house where about 10 or so women and children had fled. There were even shots exchanged among the Ustashe and the Germans."

The next day Milan Starčević's brother went with German troops back to bury the victims of the Ustashe massacre. During World War II in the municipality of Pale more than 1200 civilians were murdered, while another 350 resistance fighters were killed in the fighting.

Pale after WWII

After World War II, the town and municipality of Pale, thanks to the tireless efforts of the local population, slowly recover and resume their economic development. In 1946 on the foundations of the old log mil a new one is constructed. The mill itself employed more than 170 in the mill and an addition 150 in the forest.

In 1952 a military maintenance facility in the suburb of Koran was constructed. The local economy received the first important building block for the metal industry. Between 1952 and 1960 and additional 300–400 employees were hired in that facility.

With the development of the metal industry there are significant migration into the town, the suburb of Koran is built out with new building and apartment complexes constructed.

In 1968 the Military Maintenance complex in Koran enters is merged with the "FAMOS" corporation and is incorporated as "FAMOS-Koran". This merger brings further development and new work opportunities. Famos-Koran would go on to manufacture parts for heavy engines, transmissions and vehicles. Towards the end of the 1980s there were more than 2000 employees at Famos-Koran. In addition factories were add for the manufacture of engine turbos and manufacture of parts for the Mercedes Benz OM-360 engine that was built under licence.

War in Bosnia

During 1991 and 1992, as the tensions rose in the run up to the Bosnian War, the Pale region became an administrative center of the nascent anti-Sarajevo and pro-Serb Republika Srpska. It would remain a center of activity for the Serb forces during their Siege of Sarajevo which led to the deaths of more than 10,000 people and the wounding of 56,000 (including 15,000 children). Several high ranking Serb commanders in control of forces from the region, including General Stanislav Galić were sentenced by the International Criminal Tribunal for the former Yugoslavia (ICTY) for crimes against the people of Sarajevo where a campaign of unrelenting violence against the inhabitants was led.

The town became the nominal administrative headquarters of the Bosnian Serb government, while Banja Luka became the de facto capital. Pale remained an important cultural center with a collection of cultural and informational institutions such as a news agency (SRNA), a television station (Canal S) and newspapers (Javnost and Ognjišta) are based there.

Post Dayton

The Bosnian War ended with the signing of the Dayton Peace accords on 14 December 1995. With the war at the end the town returned to some sort of normalcy. As the Constitution of Republika Srpska sets out that Sarajevo is the capital of Republika Srpska which was recognized as an entity of Bosnia and Herzegovina by the Dayton Peace Agreement, the administrative capital has now transferred to Banja Luka.

After Dayton agreement was signed, during 1996, exodus of Sarajevo Serbs happened. Some of Sarajevo Serbs settled in Pale, leading to significant population growth of the city (in relative terms). After war, few important faculties of University of East Sarajevo are placed in Pale.

Settlements

 Bjelogorci
 Bljuštevac
 Bogovići
 Brdarići
 Brdo
 Brezovice
 Brnjica
 Brojnići
 Buđ
 Čeljadinići
 Čemernica
 Ćemanovići
 Datelji
 Donja Ljubogošta
 Donja Vinča
 Gluhovići
 Gornja Ljubogošta
 Gornja Vinča
 Gornje Pale
 Gornji Pribanj
 Gorovići
 Gradac
 Gute
 Hotočina
 Jahorina
 Jasik
 Jelovci
 Kadino Selo
 Kamenica
 Kasidoli
 Komrani
 Kosmaj
 Kostreša
 Kračule
 Luke
 Miošići
 Modrik
 Mokro
 Nehorići
 Prača
 Pavlovac
 Petovići
 Podgrab
 Podloznik
 Podmedenik
 Podvitez
 Ponor
 Prača
 Prutine
 Pustopolje
 Radonjići
 Rakite
 Rakovac
 Renovica
 Rogoušići
 Rosulje
 Saice
 Sinjevo
 Sjetlina
 Srednje
 Stajna
 Stambolčić
 Strane
 Sumbulovac
 Šainovići
 Šip
 Turkovići
 Udež
 Vinograd
 Vlahovići

Demographics

Population

Ethnic composition

Culture
 

International art event called Art Symposium Jahorina was established on May 1st 2003, and ever since it has been held annually on the Olympic mountain Jahorina, hosting great numbers of artists from around the globe.

Jahorina Film Festival is annually organized since 2007. 

In 2021 the City library in Pale celebrated 100 years of existence.

Economy
The following table gives a preview of total number of registered people employed in legal entities per their core activity (as of 2018):

Forestry

There are more than 30 logging and wood production mills in the Pale municipality. The Wood Industry in Pale is an important part of the town's economy and number of people employed there. Currently there are too many logging facilities around in the area, exceeding the renewal capacity of nearby forests.

Tourism

The local economy has a significant tourism arm. The nearby mountains of Jahorina, Trebević and Igman were used during the 1984 Winter Olympics.

The high season on Jahorina is mid-December to late January. Around the new year it is almost impossible to get accommodation without advance reservations.

The Hunting Association "Jahorina Pale" administers the "Pale" hunting grounds. These hunting grounds cover more than 37,039 hectares in the Pale and Stari Grad Municipality. The hunting grounds is one of the best-kept and -equipped hunting grounds in Republika Srpska.

The hunting grounds feature three hunting lodges; two are within the county limits of Palem, the hunting lodge "Srndać" features 35 beds, while the smaller hunting lodge "Lane" features 20 beds. The hunting grounds offer different kinds of game including: Deer, Bear, Boar and Rabbits.

A significant archeological find is located at the Orlovača cave. In 1975 the first explorers entered the cave. During August and September 2002, through the initiative of the Faculty of Philosophy in Pale  of the total length of the passages with the most beautiful cave ornaments were made accessible for tourist visits.

The cave is characterized by stable microclimate conditions, during the whole year the temperature is only  and humidity over 90%. The variety of important signs of life discovered in the cave establishes it among the richest palaeontological sites in the region. The cave bear skeletons discovered in the cave are estimated to be over 16.000 years old. Signs of prehistoric culture were spotted on the slope leading to the main cave entrance. Dating of the remnants places them in the late Bronze Age, but remnants dating back to neolite and mezolite age are also expected to be found.

Because of its scientific and aesthetic characteristics the cave is destined to become the focus of the research and educational projects of the Faculty of Philosophy in Pale. The center is planned to be built on the banks of the Sinjeva River.

Twin towns – sister cities

Pale is twinned with:
 Smederevo, Serbia
 Pomáz, Hungary

Notable people
Aleksandar Kosorić, footballer
Goran Trobok, Serbian footballer
Jelena Lolović, Serbian alpine skier
Ognjen Koroman, Serbian footballer
Trifko Grabež, (1895–1916) member of Young Bosnia (which included Gavrilo Princip), a group which was associated with the Black Hand; charged with treason and murder, alongside other members of Young Bosnia, over the assassination of Archduke Franz Ferdinand of Austria and his wife Sophie, Duchess of Hohenberg
Žana Novaković, alpine skier

References

External links

Populated places in Pale, Bosnia and Herzegovina
Cities and towns in Republika Srpska
Istočno Sarajevo
Municipalities of Republika Srpska
Romanija plateau